A list of the winners of the Award for Best Film at the Mainichi Film Award.

References

Lists of films by award
Awards for best film
Film